France Nuyen (born France Nguyễn Vân Nga on 31 July 1939) is a French actress, model, and psychological counsellor.

Early life
Nguyen was born in Marseille. Her mother was French, and her father was widely reported to be Vietnamese, although she has stated that he was "probably of Chinese origin". During World War II, her mother and grandfather were persecuted by the Nazis for being Roma.

Nguyen was raised in Marseille by a cousin she calls "an Orchidaceae raiser who was the only person who gave a damn about me." Having left school at the age of 11, she began studying art and became an artist's model.

In 1955, while working as a seamstress, Nguyen was discovered on the beach by Life photographer Philippe Halsman. She was featured on the cover of 6 October 1958 issue of Life.

Career
France Nuyen became a motion picture actress in 1958. In her first role, she appeared as Liat, daughter of Bloody Mary (played by Juanita Hall) in the Rodgers and Hammerstein musical South Pacific.

Nuyen was then cast to star in the film adaptation of The World of Suzie Wong, but was fired during production by producer Ray Stark and her scenes re-shot with her replacement, Nancy Kwan.

In 1978 Nuyen guest-starred with Peter Falk and Louis Jourdan in the Columbo episode "Murder Under Glass". In 1986 she joined the cast of St. Elsewhere as Dr. Paulette Kiem, remaining until the series ended in 1988. 

Nuyen appeared in several films including The Last Time I Saw Archie (1961) Satan Never Sleeps (1962), A Girl Named Tamiko (1962), Diamond Head (1963), Dimension 5 (1966), Battle for the Planet of the Apes (1973), The Joy Luck Club (1993) and The American Standards (2008).

With William Shatner
France Nuyen worked several times with actor William Shatner. At age 19, she was cast in Shatner's 1958 Broadway play The World of Suzie Wong (play). After a dubious initial opening, the play ran for more than 500 performances and was quite financially successful. Both Nuyen and Shatner later collected notable accolades for their work on the show, at the 1959 Theatre World Awards.

Nuyen worked again with Shatner across three US television projects, starting with "Elaan of Troyius", a 1968 third season episode of the original Star Trek in which Nuyen was the title character. She would later appear with Shatner in the 1973 made for TV movie The Horror at 37,000 Feet, and afterward in a 1974 episode of the Kung Fu series entitled "A Small Beheading".

Personal life

Nuyen had many on-and-off relationships, most notably an affair with Marlon Brando in 1960. From 1963 to 1966, Nuyen was married to Dr. Thomas Gaspar Morell, a psychiatrist from New York, by whom she has a daughter, Fleur, who resides in Canada and works as a film make-up artist. She met her second husband, Robert Culp, while appearing in four episodes of his television series I Spy. They married in 1967, but divorced three years later. 
In 1986, Nuyen earned a master's degree in clinical psychology and began a second career as a counsellor for abused women, children and women in prison. She received a Woman of the Year award in 1989 for her psychology work. In the Life cover story on Nuyen, she is quoted as saying a proverb she also repeated in character as a spy in the I Spy episode "Magic Mirror": "I am Chinese. I am a stone. I go where I am kicked."

She resides in Beverly Hills.

Filmography

Film

 South Pacific (1958) - Liat
 In Love and War (1958) - Kalai Ducanne
 The Last Time I Saw Archie (1961) - Cindy Hamilton
 Satan Never Sleeps (1962) - Siu Lan
 A Girl Named Tamiko (1962) - Tamiko
 Diamond Head (1962) - Mai Chen
 Marco Polo (1962)
 Man in the Middle (1964) - Kate Davray
 Dimension 5 (1966) - Kitty (Ki Ti Tsu)
 Black Water Gold (1970, TV Movie) - Thais
 One More Train to Rob (1971) - Ah Toy
 Slingshot (1971)
 The Horror at 37,000 Feet (1973, TV Movie) - Annalik
 The Big Game (1973) - Atanga
 Battle for the Planet of the Apes (1973) - Alma
 Code Name: Diamond Head (1977, TV Movie) - Tso-Tsing
 China Cry (1990) - Mrs. Sung
 The Joy Luck Club (1993) - Ying-Ying - The Mother
 A Passion to Kill (1994) - Lou Mazaud
 Angry Cafe (1995) - Rosie
 The Magic Pearl (1997) - (voice)
 A Smile Like Yours (1997) - Dr. Chin
 The Battle of Shaker Heights (2003) - Xiou-Xiou Ling
 The American Standards (2008) - Dr. Pierce

Television

Hong Kong - episode "Clear for Action" (1960)
The Man from U.N.C.L.E. - episode "The Cherry Blossom Affair" (1965)
 Gunsmoke - episode "Gunfighter, R.I.P." (1966) - as Ching Lee (S12E6)
 Gunsmoke - episode "Honor Before Justice" (1966) - as Sarah
 I Spy - four episodes (1966-1967)
 Star Trek - episode "Elaan of Troyius" (1968)
 Rowan & Martin's Laugh-In (1968)
 Medical Center - episode "The Battle of Lili Wu" (1969)
 Hawaii Five-O - episode "Highest Castle, Deepest Grave" (1971)
 Kung Fu - episode "A Small Beheading" (1974)
 The Six Million Dollar Man - episode "The Coward" (1974)
 Hawaii Five-O - episode "Small Witness, Large Crime" (S7 EP 17, 1975)
 Code Name: Diamond Head (1977)
 Charlie's Angels - episode "Angels in Paradise" (1977)
 Columbo - episode "Murder Under Glass" (1978)
 Fantasy Island - "Return to Fantasy Island" (1978)
 Automan - episode "Ships in the Night" (1984)
 Magnum, P.I. - episode "Torah, Torah, Torah" (1985)
 Murder, She Wrote - episode "A Death in Hong Kong" (1993)
 St. Elsewhere (1986-1988) as Dr. Paulette Kiem.
 The Outer Limits - episode "Ripper" (1999)
 "Tom Clancy's Op-Center"  - Li Tang (1995)
 Knots Landing (1990) as a doctor

References

External links

 
 
 

1939 births
Living people
Actresses of Chinese descent
Actresses of Vietnamese descent
French film actresses
French stage actresses
French television actresses
French people of Chinese descent
French people of Vietnamese descent
Actresses from Marseille
20th-century French actresses
21st-century French actresses
American_television_actresses
Clinical psychologists